Cohors VI Thracum quingenaria equitata ("6th part-mounted Cohort of Thracians") was a Roman auxiliary regiment containing cavalry contingents.
The cohort activated on Dacia and Moesia Inferior provinces. In Dacia the unit stationed on castra from the limes of Dacia Porolissensis: Porolissum, Certinae and Optatiana.

See also 
 List of Roman auxiliary regiments

Citations 

Military of ancient Rome
Auxiliary equitata units of ancient Rome
Roman Dacia